CKNO-FM (102.3 FM, 102.3 Now! Radio) is a radio station in Edmonton. Owned by the Jim Pattison Group, it broadcasts a hot adult contemporary format.

As of Feb 28, 2021, CKNO is the number one-listened-to radio station in the Edmonton market according to a PPM data report released by Numeris.

History 

The station received approval by the CRTC on October 17, 2008, and officially launched on February 23, 2010. On July 10, 2014, Rawlco announced the sale of CKNO and sister station CIUP to the Jim Pattison Group. 

Since the acquisition, Pattison has also extended the Now! format and branding (which carries a focus on topical discussions) to sister stations in Winnipeg and Vancouver. CKCE-FM in Calgary also uses a similar format, but as Today Radio.

Signage of the station’s old logo can be found at one of the parking lots at the Edmonton International Airport.

References

External links
102.3 Now! Radio
 

Kno
Kno
Kno
Radio stations established in 2010
2010 establishments in Alberta